Paul Charles Joseph Bourget (2 September 185225 December 1935) was a French poet, novelist and critic. He was nominated for the Nobel Prize in Literature five times.

Life
Paul Bourget was born in Amiens in the Somme département of Picardy, France. His father, a professor of mathematics, was later appointed to a post in the college at Clermont-Ferrand, where Bourget received his early education. He afterwards studied at the Lycée Louis-le-Grand and at the École des Hautes Études.

Between 1872 and 1873, he produced a volume of verse, Au Bord de la Mer, which was followed by others, the last, Les Aveux, appearing in 1882. Meanwhile, he was making a name in literary journalism and in 1883 he published Essais de Psychologie Contemporaine, studies of eminent writers first printed in the Nouvelle Revue, and now brought together. In 1884 Bourget paid a long visit to Britain, where he wrote his first published story (L'Irréparable). Cruelle Enigme followed in 1885; then André Cornelis (1886) and Mensonges (1887) - inspired by Octave Mirbeau's life - were received with much favour.

Bourget, who had abandoned Catholicism in 1867, began a gradual return to it in 1889, fully converting only in 1901. In 1893, in an interview he gave in America, he spoke about his changed views: "For many years I, like most young men in modern cities, was content to drift along in agnosticism, but I was brought to my senses at last by the growing realization that...the life of a man who simply said 'I don't know, and not knowing I do the thing that pleases me,' was not only empty in itself and full of disappointment and suffering, but was a positive influence for evil upon the lives of others." On the other hand, "those men and women who follow the teachings of the church are in a great measure protected from the moral disasters which...almost invariably follow when men and women allow themselves to be guided and swayed by their senses, passions and weaknesses." These were the themes of his novel Le Disciple (1889), which he wrote, as he says in his American interview, just after abandoning his "drifting and comfortable belief in agnosticism". It is the story of philosopher Adrien Sixte, whose advocacy of materialism and positivism wields a terrible influence over an admiring but unstable student, Robert Geslon, whose actions, in turn, lead to the tragic death of a young woman. Le Disciple caused a stir in France and became a bestseller. Exemplifying the novelist's graver side, it was one of Gladstone's favourite books. John Cowper Powys listed Le Disciple at number 33 in his One Hundred Best Books.

Études et portraits, first published in 1888, contains impressions of Bourget's stay in England and Ireland—especially reminiscences of the months which he spent at Oxford and in 1891 Sensations d'Italie, notes of a tour in that country, revealed a fresh phase of his powers; and Outre-Mer (1895), a book in two volumes, is his critical journal of a visit to the United States in 1893. Also in 1891 appeared the novel Coeur de Femme, and Nouveaux Pastels, "types" of the characters of men, the sequel to a similar gallery of female types (Pastels, 1890). His later novels include La Terre Promise (1892); Cosmopolis (1892), a psychological novel, with Rome as a background; Une Idylle tragique (1896); La Duchesse bleue (1897); Le Fantôme (1901); Les Deux Sœurs (1905); and some volumes of shorter stories—Complications Sentimentales (1896), the powerful Drames de famille (1898), and Un Homme d'Affaires (1900). L'Etape (1902) was a study of the inability of a family raised too rapidly from the peasant class to adapt itself to new conditions. This powerful study of contemporary manners was followed by Un Divorce (1904), a defence of the Roman Catholic position that divorce is a violation of natural laws. He was admitted to the Académie française in 1894, and in 1895 was promoted to be an officer of the Légion d'honneur, having received the decoration of the order ten years before.

Several new novels were to follow, including La Vie Passe (1910), Le Sens de la Mort (1915), Lazarine (1917), Némésis (1918), and Laurence Albani (1920), as well as three volumes of short stories and plays, La Barricade (1910) and Le Tribun (1912). Two other plays, Un Cas de Conscience (1910) and La Crise (1912) were written by him in collaboration with others. A volume of critical studies appeared in 1912, and another set of travel sketches, Le Démon du Midi, in 1914.

On 16 March 1914, he was present in the offices of the newspaper, Le Figaro when the newspaper's editor, his friend Gaston Calmette, was shot and killed by Henriette Caillaux, the wife of a former Prime Minister of France. Her subsequent trial caused an enormous scandal at the time.

He was a contributor to Le Visage de l'Italie, a 1929 book about Italy prefaced by Benito Mussolini.

Bourget died on Christmas Day 1935, aged 83, in Paris.

Literary significance and criticism
As a writer of verse Bourget's poems, which were collected in two volumes (1885–1887), throw light upon his mature method and the later products of his art. It was in criticism that he excelled. Notable are the Sensations d'Italie (1891), and the various psychological studies.

Bourget's reputation as a novelist is assured in some academic and intellectual circles but while they were widely popular in his time, his novels have long been largely forgotten by the general reading public.  Impressed by the art of Henry Beyle (Stendhal), he struck out on a new course at a moment when the realist school was the vogue in French fiction.  With Bourget, observation was mainly directed to the human character. At first his purpose seemed to be purely artistic, but when Le Disciple appeared, in 1889, the preface to that story revealed his moral enthusiasm. After that, he varied between his earlier and his later manner, but his work in general was more seriously conceived. He painted the intricate emotions of women, whether wronged, erring or actually vicious; and he described the ideas, passions and failures of the young men of France.

One of his poems was the inspiration for an art song by Claude Debussy titled Beau Soir.
Other settings by Debussy of poems by Bourget include 'Romance' and 'Les Cloches'.

Works

 
 
 

In English translation

 A Cruel Enigma (1887).
 A Woman's Heart (1890).
 Was it Love (1891).
 Pastels of Men (1891).
 Impressions of Italy (1892, rep. as The Glamour of Italy, 1923).
 A Love Crime (1892).
 A Saint (1892).
 Cosmopolis: A Novel (1893).
 The Son (1893, rep. as The Story of André Cornélis, 1909).
 The Land of Promise (1895).
 Outre-Mer: American Impressions (1895).
 A Living Lie (1896).
 A Tragic Idyl (1896). 
 Antigone, and Other Portraits of Women (1898).
 The Blue Duchess (1898).
 Domestic Dramas (1899).
 The Disciple (1901). (T. Fisher Unwin)
 Days in the Isle of Wight (1901).
 The Screen (1901).
 Some Impressions of Oxford (1901).
 Monica, and Other Stories (1902).
 A Divorce (1904).
 The Weight of the Name (1908).
 The Night Cometh (1916).
 The Gaol (1924).

Selected articles
 "The New Moral Drift in French Literature," The Forum (1893).
 "My Favorite Novelist and His Best Book," Munsey's Magazine (1897).
 "Gustave Flaubert," The Living Age (1897).
 "The Evolution of Modern French Novel," Appleton's Magazine (1903).
 "For Intellectual France," The Living Age (1919).
 "The Decline of the Diary," The Living Age (1921).
 "Pascal and Renan," The Living Age (1923).

References

Further reading

 Austin, Lloyd J. (1940). Paul Bourget. Sa vie et son œuvre jusqu'en 1889 Paris: Librairie E. Droz. 
 Beaufort, M. Pearde (1915). "Paul Bourget and Ireland," The Irish Monthly, Vol. 43, No. 509, pp. 695–703.
 Blaze de Bury, Yetta (1897). "Paul Bourget," The Forum, Vol. 23, pp. 497–514 (Rep. in French Literature of To-day. Boston and New York: Houghton, Mifflin & Company, 1898, pp. 107–132.) 
 Bowman, Edgar Milton (1925). The Early Novels of Paul Bourget. New York: Carranza & Co.
 Crawford, Virginia M. (1935). "Paul Bourget and Some Successors," Studies: An Irish Quarterly Review, Vol. 24, No. 95, pp. 433–441.
 Dimnet, Ernest (1913). Paul Bourget. London: Constable & Company, Ltd.
 Doumic, René (1899). "Paul Bourget." In: Contemporary French Novelists. New York: Thomas Y. Crowell & Company, pp. 177–211.
 Dworski, Sylvia (1941). Paul Bourget, Novelist and Short Story Writer. Ph.D. Diss., Yale University.
 Fewster, J.C. (1992). "Au Service de l'Ordre: Paul Bourget and the Critical Response to Decadence in Austria and Germany," Comparative Literature Studies, Vol. 29, No. 3, pp. 259–275.
 France, Anatole (1922). "Science and Morals: M. Paul Bourget". In: On Life and Letters. London: John Lane, The Bodley Head, Ltd., pp. 53–74.
 Goetz, T.H. (1978). "Paul Bourget's Le Disciple and the Text-Reader Relationship," The French Review, Vol. 52, No. 1, pp. 56–61.
 Gosse, Edmund (1905). "Some Recent Books of Paul Bourget." In: French Profiles. New York : Dodd, Mead and company, pp. 239–265.
 Guérard, Albert Léon (1916). "Paul Bourget." In: Five Masters of French Romance. New York: Charles Scribner's Sons, pp. 177–211.
 Lynch, Hannah (1902). "Paul Bourget, Preacher," Contemporary Review, Vol. 82, pp. 305–340.
 Jones, Edward A. (1940). "Paul Bourget and French Traditionalism," Phylon, Vol. 1, No. 2, pp. 165–174.
 Keating, L. Clark (1957). "Mark Twain and Paul Bourget," The French Review, Vol. 30, No. 5, pp. 342–349.
 Keeler, M. Jerome (1936). "Paul Bourget," The Catholic World, Vol. 142, pp. 554–561.
 Klerkx, Henri (1946). Paul Bourget et ses Idées Littéraires. Nimègue: Van de Vegt.
 Lemaître, Jules (1886). "Paul Bourget." In: Les Contemporains: Études et Portraits Littéraires. Paris: Boivin & Cie., pp. 337–364 (tr. by A.W. Evans, "Paul Bourget." In: Literary Impressions. London: Daniel O'Connor, 1921, pp. 43–79).
 Marsile, M.J. (1893). "Paul Bourget and French Literature," The Globe, Vol. IV, No. 13, pp. 650–655.
 Mathias, Yehoshua (1995). "Paul Bourget, Écrivain Engagé," Vingtième Siècle. Revue d'Histoire, No. 45, pp. 14–29.
 Maurras, Charles (1923). "Les Idées Politiques de M. Paul Bourget," Revue Hebdomadaire, Vol. 12, pp. 296–313.
 O'Rell, Max (1898). "Mark Twain and Paul Bourget," The North American Review, Vol. 160, No. 460, pp. 302–310.
 Secor, Walter Todd (1948). Paul Bourget and the Nouvelle. New York: King's Crown Press.
 Singer, Armand E. (1976). Paul Bourget. Boston: Twayne Publishers.
 Smith, Garnet (1892). "Paul Bourget," The Gentleman's Magazine, Vol. 272, pp. 370–385.
 Turquet-Milnes, G. (1921). "Paul Bourget." In: Some Modern French Writers: A Study in Bergsonism. New York: Robert M. McBride & Company, pp. 107–130.
 Twain, Mark (1895). "What Paul Bourget Thinks of Us," The North American Review, Vol. 160, No. 458, pp. 48–62 (Rep. in How to Tell a Story, and Other Essays. New York: Harper & Brothers Publishers, 1898, pp. 181–212.)
 Vickers, Jackie (1992). "Women and Wealth: F. Scott Fitzgerald, Edith Wharton and Paul Bourget," Journal of American Studies, Vol. 26, No. 2, pp. 261–263.

External links

 
 
 Works by Paul Bourget, at Hathi Trust
 
 

1852 births
1935 deaths
People from Amiens
Lycée Louis-le-Grand alumni
École pratique des hautes études alumni
French literary critics
French psychological fiction writers
19th-century French novelists
French travel writers
20th-century French non-fiction writers
20th-century French male writers
French monarchists
Converts to Roman Catholicism from atheism or agnosticism
French Roman Catholics
Roman Catholic writers
Members of the Académie Française
People affiliated with Action Française
Officiers of the Légion d'honneur
Burials at Montparnasse Cemetery
French male novelists
Members of the Ligue de la patrie française
19th-century French male writers
French male non-fiction writers